Nancy Thayer (born December 14, 1943) is an American novelist who has written thirty-one books.

Personal life
Thayer is the daughter of Jane Patton and was born in December 14, 1943 in Emporia, Kansas. Thayer married her second husband, Charles Walters, a music store owner, in 1984. They live in Nantucket, Massachusetts, and have two children: Joshua Thayer and Samantha Wilde, who is also a novelist.

Career
Thayer published her first novel when she was close to forty and already the mother of her two children. She has published regularly since. Her novels focus on contemporary social issues coupled with interesting plots and characters.

Her books have been translated into Dutch, Italian, German, Danish, French, Spanish, Portuguese, Polish, Swedish, Romanian, Hebrew and Finnish.

Books
Stepping (1980, Doubleday)
Three Women At the Waters' Edge (1981, Doubleday)
Bodies and Souls (1983, Doubleday)
Nell (1984, William Morrow)
Morning (1987, Charles Scribner's Sons)
Spirit Lost (1988, Charles Scribner's Sons)
My Dearest Friend (1988, Charles Scribner's Sons)
Everlasting (1991, Viking)
Family Secrets (1993, Viking)
Belonging (1995, St. Martin's Press)
An Act Of Love (1997, St. Martin's Press)
Between Husbands and Friends (1999, St. Martin's Press)
Custody (2001, St. Martin's Press)
The Hot Flash Club (2003, Ballantine)
The Hot Flash Club Strikes Again (2004, Ballantine)
Hot Flash Holidays (2005, Ballantine)
The Hot Flash Club Chills Out (2006, Ballantine)
Moon Shell Beach (2008, Ballantine)
Summer House (2009, Ballantine)
Beachcombers (2010, Ballantine)
Heat Wave (2011, Ballantine)
Summer Breeze (2012, Ballantine)
Island Girls (2013, Ballantine)
A Nantucket Christmas (2013, Ballantine) Nantucket Sisters (2014)An Island Christmas (2014, Ballantine Books) The Guest Cottage (2015, Ballantine Books) The Island House (2016)Secrets in Summer (2017)A Nantucket Wedding (2018)Surfside Sisters  (2019)Let It Snow  (2019)Girls of Summer  (2020)Family Reunion  (2021)Summer Love  (2022)

 Articles 
 "Plotting the Novel" (1988) 

Adaptations
 Stepping was adapted as 13 part series for British Broadcasting Corporation (BBC)
 Spirit Lost'' was adapted for film and released by United Image Entertainment

References 

Portland Book Review | Tag Archives: Nancy Thayer
Review: Summer House by Nancy Thayer | Book, Line, and Sinker
Novel Escapes: Island Girls by Nancy Thayer
Summer Breeze by Nancy Thayer - Summer Reading 2012 - Woman's Day
Summer House | Bookreporter.com
The Barnstable Patriot - Books reviewed in The Barnstable Patriot

Living people
American women novelists
20th-century American novelists
21st-century American novelists
Novelists from Massachusetts
20th-century American women writers
21st-century American women writers
1943 births